José Gildásio Pereira de Matos (born November 3, 1966), commonly known by the nickname Gil Baiano, is a retired professional association football right back, who played for several Campeonato Brasileiro Série A clubs, and for the Brazil national team.

Career
Born in Tucano, Bahia, Gil Baiano started playing professionally in 1987, defending Campinas' club Guarani. In 1988, he was transferred to Bragantino, of Bragança Paulista, winning the Campeonato Paulista in 1990, and playing 62 Campeonato Brasileiro Série A games during his spell at the club. In 1993, he joined Palmeiras, where he played 19 Série A games. leaving the club in 1994, to defend Vitória, playing  20 games Série A until leaving the club. In 1995, he played 20 Série A games for Paraná, leaving the club in 1996, to play for Portuguese club Sporting Portugal. In 1998, he returned to Brazil, playing for Ituano, then Paraná again, where he played nine Série A games. In 1999,  he played again for Bragantino, joining Comercial-SP in 2000. In 2000, he also played four Série A games for Paraná, joining XV de Piracicaba in 2001, and retiring while playing for Bragantino in 2002.

National team
Gil Baiano played seven games defending the Brazil national team, without scoring a goal. His first game was played on September 12, 1990, against Spain. He played his last game for Brazil on March 26, 1991, against Argentina.

References

External links 
 

1966 births
Living people
Sportspeople from Bahia
Brazilian footballers
Brazil international footballers
Guarani FC players
Clube Atlético Bragantino players
Sociedade Esportiva Palmeiras players
Esporte Clube Vitória players
Paraná Clube players
Sporting CP footballers
Ituano FC players
Comercial Futebol Clube (Ribeirão Preto) players
Esporte Clube XV de Novembro (Piracicaba) players
Brazilian expatriate footballers
Expatriate footballers in Portugal
Association football fullbacks